The Kudymkar constituency (No.61) is a Russian legislative constituency in Perm Krai. Previously the constituency covered northern Perm Oblast, however, in 2015 the constituency absorbed the territory of former Komi-Permyak constituency of the Komi-Permyak Autonomous Okrug, which was merged with Perm Oblast in 2005 to create Perm Krai.

Members elected

Election results

1993

|-
! colspan=2 style="background-color:#E9E9E9;text-align:left;vertical-align:top;" |Candidate
! style="background-color:#E9E9E9;text-align:left;vertical-align:top;" |Party
! style="background-color:#E9E9E9;text-align:right;" |Votes
! style="background-color:#E9E9E9;text-align:right;" |%
|-
|style="background-color:"|
|align=left|Vladimir Kravtsov
|align=left|Independent
|
|35.31%
|-
|style="background-color:"|
|align=left|Sergey Sysuyev
|align=left|Independent
| -
|20.40%
|-
| colspan="5" style="background-color:#E9E9E9;"|
|- style="font-weight:bold"
| colspan="3" style="text-align:left;" | Total
| 
| 100%
|-
| colspan="5" style="background-color:#E9E9E9;"|
|- style="font-weight:bold"
| colspan="4" |Source:
|
|}

1995

|-
! colspan=2 style="background-color:#E9E9E9;text-align:left;vertical-align:top;" |Candidate
! style="background-color:#E9E9E9;text-align:left;vertical-align:top;" |Party
! style="background-color:#E9E9E9;text-align:right;" |Votes
! style="background-color:#E9E9E9;text-align:right;" |%
|-
|style="background-color:"|
|align=left|Valentin Stepankov
|align=left|Independent
|
|39.65%
|-
|style="background-color:"|
|align=left|Sergey Novozhilov
|align=left|Liberal Democratic Party
|
|12.54%
|-
|style="background-color:"|
|align=left|Vladimir Kravtsov (incumbent)
|align=left|Independent
|
|11.86%
|-
|style="background-color:"|
|align=left|Galina Shamsina
|align=left|Independent
|
|10.25%
|-
|style="background-color:"|
|align=left|Yury Pastukhov
|align=left|Yabloko
|
|7.34%
|-
|style="background-color:#1C1A0D"|
|align=left|Tatyana Arkhipenko
|align=left|Forward, Russia!
|
|6.05%
|-
|style="background-color:#000000"|
|colspan=2 |against all
|
|10.46%
|-
| colspan="5" style="background-color:#E9E9E9;"|
|- style="font-weight:bold"
| colspan="3" style="text-align:left;" | Total
| 
| 100%
|-
| colspan="5" style="background-color:#E9E9E9;"|
|- style="font-weight:bold"
| colspan="4" |Source:
|
|}

1999

|-
! colspan=2 style="background-color:#E9E9E9;text-align:left;vertical-align:top;" |Candidate
! style="background-color:#E9E9E9;text-align:left;vertical-align:top;" |Party
! style="background-color:#E9E9E9;text-align:right;" |Votes
! style="background-color:#E9E9E9;text-align:right;" |%
|-
|style="background-color:"|
|align=left|Valentina Savostyanova
|align=left|Independent
|
|20.12%
|-
|style="background-color:"|
|align=left|Gennady Belkin
|align=left|Independent
|
|17.34%
|-
|style="background-color:#1042A5"|
|align=left|Aleksey Tokarev
|align=left|Union of Right Forces
|
|17.15%
|-
|style="background-color:#3B9EDF"|
|align=left|Valentin Stepankov (incumbent)
|align=left|Fatherland – All Russia
|
|16.65%
|-
|style="background-color:"|
|align=left|Konstantin Kurchenkov
|align=left|Independent
|
|7.60%
|-
|style="background-color:"|
|align=left|Yury Perkhun
|align=left|Communist Party
|
|6.32%
|-
|style="background-color:"|
|align=left|Viktor Yaburov
|align=left|Our Home – Russia
|
|2.05%
|-
|style="background-color:#000000"|
|colspan=2 |against all
|
|10.87%
|-
| colspan="5" style="background-color:#E9E9E9;"|
|- style="font-weight:bold"
| colspan="3" style="text-align:left;" | Total
| 
| 100%
|-
| colspan="5" style="background-color:#E9E9E9;"|
|- style="font-weight:bold"
| colspan="4" |Source:
|
|}

2003

|-
! colspan=2 style="background-color:#E9E9E9;text-align:left;vertical-align:top;" |Candidate
! style="background-color:#E9E9E9;text-align:left;vertical-align:top;" |Party
! style="background-color:#E9E9E9;text-align:right;" |Votes
! style="background-color:#E9E9E9;text-align:right;" |%
|-
|style="background-color:#00A1FF"|
|align=left|Valentina Savostyanova (incumbent)
|align=left|Party of Russia's Rebirth-Russian Party of Life
|
|35.45%
|-
|style="background-color:"|
|align=left|Aleksandr Kamenskikh
|align=left|Independent
|
|34.15%
|-
|style="background-color:"|
|align=left|Aleksey Tokarev
|align=left|Independent
|
|6.67%
|-
|style="background-color:"|
|align=left|Lyubov Gribova
|align=left|Independent
|
|3.80%
|-
|style="background-color:"|
|align=left|Oleg Plotnikov
|align=left|Liberal Democratic Party
|
|3.34%
|-
|style="background-color:#000000"|
|colspan=2 |against all
|
|14.92%
|-
| colspan="5" style="background-color:#E9E9E9;"|
|- style="font-weight:bold"
| colspan="3" style="text-align:left;" | Total
| 
| 100%
|-
| colspan="5" style="background-color:#E9E9E9;"|
|- style="font-weight:bold"
| colspan="4" |Source:
|
|}

2016

|-
! colspan=2 style="background-color:#E9E9E9;text-align:left;vertical-align:top;" |Candidate
! style="background-color:#E9E9E9;text-align:left;vertical-align:top;" |Party
! style="background-color:#E9E9E9;text-align:right;" |Votes
! style="background-color:#E9E9E9;text-align:right;" |%
|-
|style="background-color: " |
|align=left|Dmitry Sazonov
|align=left|United Russia
|
|38.22%
|-
|style="background-color:"|
|align=left|Tatyana Kamenskikh
|align=left|Liberal Democratic Party
|
|14.35%
|-
|style="background-color:"|
|align=left|Darya Eisfeld
|align=left|A Just Russia
|
|13.77%
|-
|style="background-color:"|
|align=left|Irina Filatova
|align=left|Communist Party
|
|11.19%
|-
|style="background-color: " |
|align=left|Olga Kolokolova
|align=left|Yabloko
|
|6.17%
|-
|style="background:"|
|align=left|Vitaly Tytyanevich
|align=left|Communists of Russia
|
|4.92%
|-
|style="background:"|
|align=left|Valentin Murzayev
|align=left|People's Freedom Party
|
|1.63%
|-
| colspan="5" style="background-color:#E9E9E9;"|
|- style="font-weight:bold"
| colspan="3" style="text-align:left;" | Total
| 
| 100%
|-
| colspan="5" style="background-color:#E9E9E9;"|
|- style="font-weight:bold"
| colspan="4" |Source:
|
|}

2021

|-
! colspan=2 style="background-color:#E9E9E9;text-align:left;vertical-align:top;" |Candidate
! style="background-color:#E9E9E9;text-align:left;vertical-align:top;" |Party
! style="background-color:#E9E9E9;text-align:right;" |Votes
! style="background-color:#E9E9E9;text-align:right;" |%
|-
|style="background-color: " |
|align=left|Irina Ivenskikh
|align=left|United Russia
|
|25.17%
|-
|style="background-color:"|
|align=left|Ksenia Aytakova
|align=left|Communist Party
|
|16.12%
|-
|style="background-color:"|
|align=left|Grigory Malinin
|align=left|A Just Russia — For Truth
|
|13.80%
|-
|style="background-color: "|
|align=left|Dmitry Gromov
|align=left|Party of Pensioners
|
|8.75%
|-
|style="background-color:"|
|align=left|Andrey Zakharov
|align=left|Liberal Democratic Party
|
|8.32%
|-
|style="background:"|
|align=left|Lyudmila Averkina
|align=left|Communists of Russia
|
|7.86%
|-
|style="background-color: " |
|align=left|Aleksey Ovchinnikov
|align=left|New People
|
|7.40%
|-
|style="background-color: " |
|align=left|Olga Kolokolova
|align=left|Yabloko
|
|2.75%
|-
| colspan="5" style="background-color:#E9E9E9;"|
|- style="font-weight:bold"
| colspan="3" style="text-align:left;" | Total
| 
| 100%
|-
| colspan="5" style="background-color:#E9E9E9;"|
|- style="font-weight:bold"
| colspan="4" |Source:
|
|}

Notes

References

Russian legislative constituencies
Politics of Perm Krai